George Owens (26 Nov 1894 – Dec 1978), also known by the nickname of 'Dodger', was a Welsh rugby union, and professional rugby league footballer who played in the 1910s and 1920s.

Playing career

Change of code
Following a meeting with a Wigan rugby league club representative at the Bush Hotel, Swansea on Sunday 28 September 1913, Swansea RFC's rugby union half-back pairing of Sidney Jerram, and George Owens were each signed for £180 down payment (based on increases in average earnings, this would be approximately £61,630 in 2013), guaranteed win bonuses, and jobs for £2 per week cash.

International honours
George Owens won a cap for Wales (RL) while at Wigan in 1923.

Championship final appearances
George Owens played , in Wigan's 22–10 victory over Warrington in the Championship Final during the 1925–26 season at Knowsley Road, St. Helens on Saturday 8 May 1926.

County League appearances
George Owens played in Wigan's victories in the Lancashire County League during the 1913–14 season, 1914–15 season, 1920–21 season, 1922–23 season, 1923–24 season and 1925–26 season.

County Cup Final appearances
George Owens played , in Wigan's 20–2 victory over Leigh in the 1922–23 Lancashire County Cup Final during the 1922–23 season at The Willows, Salford on Saturday 25 November 1922, and played  in the 11–15 defeat by Swinton in the 1925–26 Lancashire County Cup Final during the 1925–26 season at The Cliff, Broughton on Wednesday 9 December 1925.

Notable tour matches
George Owens played , in Wigan's 36–15 victory over New Zealand in the tour match during the 1925–26 season at Central Park, Wigan on Saturday 11 December 1926.

References

External links
Statistics at wigan.rlfans.com
Team – Past Players – O at swansearfc.co.uk (profile missing)

1894 births
1978 deaths
Footballers who switched code
Place of birth missing
Rugby league five-eighths
St Helens R.F.C. players
Swansea RFC players
Wales national rugby league team players
Welsh rugby league players
Welsh rugby union players
Wigan Warriors players